Ursula's sunbird (Cinnyris ursulae) is a species of bird in the family Nectariniidae restricted to the continental and near-shore portions of the Cameroon line.

Taxonomy
Monotypic. Formerly considered a member of the genus Nectarinia along with other Cinnyris sunbirds.

Habitat and Distribution

Its natural habitat is subtropical or tropical moist montane forests. Its distribution is almost wholly restricted to the Cameroonian Highlands forests and Mount Cameroon and Bioko montane forests ecoregions, occurring in Nigeria, Cameroon, and Equatorial Guinea (specifically, on Bioko). It is threatened by habitat loss.

References

Ursula's sunbird
Birds of the Gulf of Guinea
Birds of Central Africa
Ursula's sunbird
Taxonomy articles created by Polbot